The 1983 Norwegian Football Cup was the 78th edition of the Norwegian annual knockout football tournament. The Cup was won by Moss after beating Vålerengen in the cup final with the score 2–0. This was Moss's first Norwegian Cup title.

First round

|colspan="3" style="background-color:#97DEFF"|20 May 1983

|-
|colspan="3" style="background-color:#97DEFF"|25 May 1983

|-
|colspan="3" style="background-color:#97DEFF"|26 May 1983

|-
|colspan="3" style="background-color:#97DEFF"|1 June 1983

|-
|colspan="3" style="background-color:#97DEFF"|Replay: 2 June 1983

|}

Second round

|colspan="3" style="background-color:#97DEFF"|7 June 1983

|-
|colspan="3" style="background-color:#97DEFF"|8 June 1983

|-
|colspan="3" style="background-color:#97DEFF"|9 June 1983

|-
|colspan="3" style="background-color:#97DEFF"|Replay: 15 June 1983

|-
|colspan="3" style="background-color:#97DEFF"|Replay: 16 June 1983

|-
|colspan="3" style="background-color:#97DEFF"|Replay: 21 June 1983

|}

Third round

|colspan="3" style="background-color:#97DEFF"|22 June 1983

|-
|colspan="3" style="background-color:#97DEFF"|24 June 1983

|}

Fourth round

|colspan="3" style="background-color:#97DEFF"|26 July 1983

|-
|colspan="3" style="background-color:#97DEFF"|27 July 1983

|}

Quarter-finals

|colspan="3" style="background-color:#97DEFF"|24 August 1983

|}

Semi-finals

|colspan="3" style="background-color:#97DEFF"|18 September 1983

|}

Final

Moss's winning team: Nils Espen Eriksen, Rune Gjestrumbakken, Tore Gregersen, Morten Vinje, Svein Grøndalen, Jan Rafn, Stein Kollshaugen, Per Heliasz, Ole Johnny Henriksen, Brede Halvorsen, Geir Henæs, Hans Deunk, Odd Skauen and Pål Grønstad

Vålerenga's team: Tom R. Jacobsen, Per Gunnar Bredesen, Trond Sollied, Dag Roar Austmo, Tor Brevik, Henning Bjarnøy, Vidar Davidsen, Stein Gran, Egil Johansen, Lasse Eriksen, Paal Fredheim (from 61.), Jo Bergsvand and Pål Jacobsen (from 61).

References
http://www.rsssf.no

Norwegian Football Cup seasons
Norway
Football Cup